Stephen Kettle (born 12 July 1966, in Castle Bromwich, Warwickshire, England) is a British sculptor who works exclusively with slate.

Career

Kettle is a self-taught sculptor with no formal training. His best known works include Supermarine Spitfire designer R. J. Mitchell, commissioned for the Science Museum in London, which was the first statue of its type in the world, and a life size Statue of Alan Turing, the founder of computer science and Enigma codebreaker, commissioned by the American philanthropist Sidney Frank for Bletchley Park in Buckinghamshire.

Besides Turing and Mitchell, other notable portrait busts include:
 
 George Zambellas, first sea lord at RNAS Yeovilton
 Winston Churchill in  Buckingham Palace
 Frederick Barclay at the London Ritz
 Donald Gosling
  Ronald Hobson 
  a double portrait of the Prince of Wales and the Duchess of Cornwall in the grounds of Highgrove House in Gloucestershire.

Personal life
Kettle lives with his wife and three children in west London.

References

1966 births
Living people
People from Castle Bromwich
20th-century British sculptors
21st-century British sculptors
21st-century male artists
English male sculptors
Slate